Bill Scott or Billy Scott may refer to:

Arts and entertainment
Bill Scott (voice actor) (1920–1985), American voice actor and animation writer
Billy "Uke" Scott (1923–2004), British music hall performer and ukulele player
Bill Scott (author) (1923–2005), Australian author, songwriter, poet and collector of Australian folk history
Billy Scott (singer) (1942–2012), American R&B musician
Bill Scott (artist) (born 1956), Contemporary American painter

Sports

Association football (soccer)
Billy Scott (footballer, born 1884) (1882–1936), Irish footballer
Billy Scott (footballer, born 1907) (1907–1969), English footballer
Bill Scott (Irish footballer) (fl. 1920s–1930s), Irish footballer

Australian rules football
Bill Scott (footballer, born 1880) (1880–1969), Australian rules footballer for South Melbourne
Bill H. Scott (1886–1960), Australian rules footballer for Richmond
Bill Scott (footballer, born 1890) (1890–1968), Australian rules footballer for Fitzroy and Essendon

Auto racing
Billy Scott (racing driver) (1948–2017), American race car driver
Bill Scott (racing driver) (fl. 1959), American race car driver in 1959 Western North Carolina 500
Billy Scott (crew chief) (born 1977), American race car driver

Other sports
William Patrick Scott (Bill Scott, 1880–1948), Scottish rugby player
Bill Scott (rugby league) (born 1896), New Zealand rugby league footballer
Bill Scott (American football) (born 1944), American football player
Bill Scott (basketball) (fl. 1951–1962), American college basketball coach and athletics administrator
Bill Scott (athlete) (born 1952), Australian long-distance runner, 1980 Summer Olympics
Bill Scott (bowls) (fl. 1970–1974), Scottish lawn bowler
Bill Scott (ice hockey) (born 1980), Canadian ice hockey executive

Other
Bill Scott (priest) (1946–2020), British Anglican priest, former Domestic Chaplain to the Queen

See also
William Scott (disambiguation)
Willie Scott (disambiguation)